This list of the largest companies of Norway contains the 500 largest companies in Norway by revenue. Information is provided on revenue, operating income, net income and number of employees. Financial amounts are in millions of Norwegian kroner (1 US dollar = 8.85 kroner as of 12/02/2022). The information provided for each company includes subsidiaries. Also on the list are subsidiaries of foreign companies. The list is based on the audited accounts for 2006.

References

Largest
Norway